Clanis pratti is a species of moth of the family Sphingidae first described by James John Joicey and George Talbot in 1921. It is known from Sulawesi and surrounding islands in Indonesia.

Subspecies
Clanis pratti pratti
Clanis pratti okurai Cadiou & Holloway, 1989

References

Clanis
Moths described in 1921